Maaroom is coastal rural locality in the Fraser Coast Region, Queensland, Australia.

Education 
There are no schools in Maaroom. The nearest primary and secondary schools are in Maryborough and its suburbs.

References 

Fraser Coast Region
Coastline of Queensland
Localities in Queensland